Guizhou University, known as Guida (贵大), is a provincial research university located in suburban Guiyang, capital of Guizhou, China. Founded in 1902, it is the flagship institution of higher learning in Guizhou province. The university was a national key university in the “One Province, One School” project in the Midwest of China. With over 30,000 students, Guizhou University is one of the largest universities in Southwest China and is consistently ranked the best in the province.

The university was selected to participate in Double First Class University Plan and former Project 211, government initiatives provided funding to elevate the research standards and faculty hiring resources of rising universities across China. In 2017, the university was recognized by the Chinese Ministry of Education as a Double First Class University, which the government seeks to elevate to "world-class" status.

History
The predecessor of the modern Guizhou University was known as the Guizhou Institute of Higher Learning, which was founded in 1902. The institute evolved into the Provincial Guizhou University, National Guizhou College of Agriculture and Engineering, and finally National Guizhou University.

In 1997, the Guizhou Agricultural College, Guizhou Institute of Arts, and Guizhou Agricultural Cadre-Training School were merged into NGU to form Guizhou University.

In 2004, the Guizhou University of Technology merged into Guizhou University to complete the current Guizhou University. In 2005, the university was invited as a member of Project 211 by the Ministry of Education.

The university is included in the Chinese state Double First Class University Plan.

Guizhou University established a sister school relationship with the Presbyterian College in Clinton, South Carolina; the latter offers a Chinese language program for the fifteen American students every year.

Disciplines
The university consists of 39 colleges and offers programs of study in 11 academic divisions leading to associate, baccalaureate, master's, and doctoral degrees. These include:
Agriculture
Administration 
Economics
Education
Engineering
History
Law
Liberal arts
Medicine 
Philosophy
Sciences

Rankings and reputation 
Guizhou University ranked the best in Guizhou Province by several major international university rankings. As of 2022, Guizhou University ranked 579th by SCImago Institutions Rankings among research universities around the world.  The 2021 CWTS Leiden Ranking ranked Guizhou University at 755th in the world based on their publications for the period 2016–2019. The university was ranked 701-800th globally by the Academic Ranking of World Universities (ARWU).  The Nature Index 2021 Annual Tables by Nature Research ranked Guizhou University at 335th among leading academic research institutions in the Asia-Pacific for the high quality of research publications in natural science.

As of 2021, Guizhou University ranked 135th in China by the Academic Ranking of World Universities and 164th by the U.S. News & World Report Best Global University Ranking.

International cooperation and Peace Corps involvement
In 1989 Guizhou Agricultural College, then a separate university, began hosting VSO teachers in the Foreign Language Department. The following year, Guizhou University began hosting foreign teachers from the AISH programme in Australia and visiting teacher programmes in both New Zealand and the University of Alabama. Simultaneously, VSO teachers from the UK and the Netherlands were recruited to work in other Guiyang institutes of higher education including the school of fashion and the catering college, both experiencing booms concurrent with Guiyang's emergence from relative obscurity. These teachers taught in both the undergraduate and post-graduate programmes at each institution.

In 2005, eight years after Gui Nong (Guizhou Agricultural College) was merged with Gui Da (Guizhou University), Guizhou University began hosting United States Peace Corps Volunteers. The volunteers teach at both the undergraduate and graduate level in the School of Foreign Languages.

Campus 
Guizhou University has nine campuses situated in different locations around the city of Guiyang. The administrative center is located on the North Campus on the Huaxi River, Huaxi District of Guiyang.

See also

 List of universities in China

Gallery

References

External links 

Guizhou University homepage English version

 
Universities and colleges in Guizhou
Education in Guizhou
Project 211
Forestry education
Educational institutions established in 1902
1902 establishments in China
Universities and colleges formed by merger in China